Hurden railway station is a railway station in the Swiss canton of Schwyz and municipality of Freienbach. The station is located on the Rapperswil to Pfäffikon line that crosses the Seedamm between the two shores of Lake Zurich. It takes its name from the nearby village of Hurden.

Services 
The station is an intermediate stop on Zurich S-Bahn service S40. During weekends, there is also a nighttime S-Bahn service (SN5) offered by ZVV.

 Zürich S-Bahn:
 Nighttime S-Bahn (only during weekends):

References

External links 
 

Hurden
Hurden
Freienbach